Myles Najee Martin (born May 20, 1996) is an American freestyle wrestler and graduated folkstyle wrestler who competes at 86 kilograms. In freestyle, he placed second at the '19 US National Championships and is a two-time US U23 National Champion. As a folkstyle wrestler, he was an NCAA Division I National champion (two-time finalist), a four-time All-American and a Big Ten Conference champion (three-time finalist) out of the Ohio State University.

Folkstyle career

High school 
Born in Penns Grove, New Jersey, Martin went on to attend McDonogh School in Maryland. During his time as a high schooler, he became a three-time US Prep National champion, two-time Beast of the East champion, two-time FloNationals finalist, one-time Walsh Jesuit Ironman finalist and was also named the Baltimore Sun All-Metro Wrestler of the Year as a senior in 2015. Inside the state of Maryland, he was a three-time Maryland Independent Schools champion and finished his career with an 171–15 record, thirteen of those losses coming in his first two seasons.

Before entering his senior year, Martin competed at Who's Number One on October 18, 2014, where he was defeated by eventual two-time NCAA champion Zahid Valencia in over-time.

College 
On September 30, 2014, it was announced that a junior Martin had committed to wrestle at the Ohio State University as the third-ranked recruit in the country.

2015-16 
Martin had one of the best true freshman seasons in the history of the program. During regular season, he was originally a redshirt athlete, compiling titles from the Eastern Michigan Open and the Findlay Open and was runner-up at the Nittany Lion Open. His redshirt was pulled to start the 2016 year and he made his dual debut on January 23, against Isaac Reinemann from Illinois, whom he drove to a technical fall after scoring 23 points to 7. He closed regular season with a 6–3 mark on dual meets and a 24–5 record overall. Entering the Big Ten Conference Championships as the fourth-seed, Martin was able to place third, with a notable victory over Nate Jackson from Indiana before being pinned by the top-seed Bo Nickal from Penn State. At the NCAA championships, Martin was the eleventh seed, however, he was able to create a massive upset and make it to the finals, where he won the NCAA title by defeating the phenom Bo Nickal with a score of 11–9. This made Martin the fifteenth true freshman in history and the first Buckeye ever to become an NCAA champion and the first eleventh seed to do so since 1979.

2016-17 
Martin then moved up a weight class, from 174 to 184 pounds. During his regular sophomore season, he won a title from the Journeyman Collegiate Classic and placed third at the CKVL Invitational and eight at the Midland Championships. In duals, he went 11–3, adding bonus points in 9 of those wins.

At the Big Ten Championships, he was able to reach the finals, where he lost to Iowa's Sammy Brooks to place second and help the Buckeyes win the Team Title. At the NCAA's, Martin, the sixth seed, was upset in the second round by the eleventh seed, after a major decision over Nick Wanzek. In the consolation brackets, he bounced back with four straight wins before his defeat to Sammy Brooks, being thrown to the fifth place match. Martin was able to claim the fifth place with a win over fourth-seed Nolan Boyd, becoming a two-time All-American.

2017-18 
Throughout his junior season, Martin compiled 31 wins (25 of them involved bonus points) and 3 losses (all of them to his rival, Bo Nickal), leading the Buckeyes in total wins, technical falls (12), majors (7) and dual point-difference (+60). He firstly rocked 22 consecutive victories before his first loss to Bo Nickal in a dual against Penn State, and won the Cliff Keen and Princeton Open titles.

At the Big Ten Championships, he reached the finals for his second-straight year, where he caught his second season-loss to Nickal to end up as the runner-up. At the NCAA's, he comfortably compiled four victories to reach his second finale, where he was defeated for the sixth time by Bo Nickal, now by fall to end the heated rivalry 6–2 in favor of Nickal.

2018-19 
As a senior, he went undefeated during regular season, claiming the Cliff Keen Invitational title (named the Outstanding Wrestler) and going 12–0 in dual meets. At the Big Ten Conference Championships, Martin was able to make his third straight final and claim his first title from the tournament. Going into his final NCAA tournament, Martin, the top-seed, said;

At the tournament, he made the semifinals with two major decisions and a pin. Going into his fourth match, Martin was a big favorite to win over Max Dean, as he had dominantly defeated him twice earlier in the season, but he suffered his only loss of the season when Dean was able to edge him by a point, creating a huge upset. Martin came back to take third-place in his final collegiate match.

As a collegiate wrestler, Martin became an NCAA champion, a Big Ten Conference champion and a four-time NCAA Division I All-American with a record of 121-19 for the Ohio State Buckeyes.

Freestyle career

Age-group 
In the age-group, Martin was a four-time UWW US National All-American, and a runner-up at the junior level tournament in 2015 and 2016.

Senior level

2017-2018 
Martin made his senior freestyle debut in June 2017, when he claimed the US University National title. On October, he became the runner-up of the U23 World Team Trials to Sammy Brooks. In June 2018, Martin became the US U23 National Champion and World Team Member, after defeating seven opponents at the tournament. On November, he represented the United States internationally for the first time, at the U23 World Championships, and went 1–1 to place eleventh.

2019 
After graduating from college in March, Martin competed a month later at the US Open Nationals. After reaching the semifinals with four straight victories, he was derailed by the eventual champion and '12 Junior World Championship runner-up Pat Downey, in a high-paced 16-point match. On May, Martin competed at the US World Team Trials, where after defeating two-time NCAA Division I All-American Nate Jackson, he was downed by the veteran and three-time All-American Nick Heflin to deny Martin the possibility of making the US World Team and send him to the consolation brackets, where he defeated '19 NCAA champion Drew Foster and Jackson once again.

On November, Martin competed at the Bill Farrell Memorial International, where after making the finals with four wins, he was defeated by the internationally experienced and three-time NCAA Division I National champion Alex Dieringer to claim the silver medal. At the US Nationals of December, Martin avenged his losses to Nick Heflin and to Dieringer, with a last-second takedown for the latter. In the finals, he was closely defeated in an exciting match by two-time NCAA DI champion Zahid Valencia, claiming runner-up honors.

2020 
To start off the year, Martin competed overseas, at the Grand Prix of France of January. After downing '19 (returning) World Championship medalist Stefan Reichmuth in the first round, Martin compiled three wins over foreigner opponents to claim his first Gold medal from an international tournament.

Martin was scheduled to compete at the '20 US Olympic Team Trials on April 4, at State College, Pennsylvania. However, the event was postponed for 2021 along with the Summer Olympics due to the COVID-19 pandemic, leaving all the qualifiers unable to compete.

After being unable to compete due to the pandemic, Martin made his next appearance in July, on short notice (replacing Pat Downey), against '18 World Champion David Taylor, at the FloWrestling: Dake vs. Chamizo card. He was dominantly defeated by the American great. On October, Martin made his return to the top of the podium while defeating three opponents at the Flo 8-Man Challenge of October, while also claiming $20,000.

2021 
To start off the year, Martin avenged his loss from the '19 NCAA championships by defeating Max Dean at the PRTC Summit I, on January 29. Martin then wrestled at the prestigious Matteo Pellicone Ranking Series on March 7. After a decision over '18 Pan American runner-up Ethan Ramos, Martin was defeated by three-time age-group World Champion Mark Hall to get thrown to repechage, where he claimed two more victories and claimed the bronze. On March 22, it was announced that Martin had moved back to his native New Jersey to become a resident–athlete at the Scarlet Knights Wrestling Club.

Martin competed at the rescheduled US Olympic Team on April 2, in an attempt of representing the United States at the 2020 Summer Olympics. He went 1–2, defeating reigning NCAA champion Carter Starocci in the consolation bracket.

Martin had registered to compete at the prestigious Poland Open on June 8, moving up to 92 kilograms, but eventually pulled out. However, he remained with the intent of moving up a weight class and will now compete at the 2021 US World Team Trials on September 11–12 as the fifth-seed, intending to represent the country at the World Championships.

Freestyle record 

! colspan="7"| Senior & U23 Freestyle Matches
|-
!  Res.
!  Record
!  Opponent
!  Score
!  Date
!  Event
!  Location
|-
|Loss
|46–14
|align=left| Mark Hall
|style="font-size:88%"|1–2
|style="font-size:88%"|March 16, 2022
|style="font-size:88%"|Rudis+: Snyder vs. Cox
|style="text-align:left;font-size:88%;"|
 Detroit, Michigan
|-
! style=background:white colspan=7 |
|-
|Loss
|46–13
|align=left| Trent Hidlay
|style="font-size:88%"|5–9
|style="font-size:88%" rowspan=4|September 11, 2021
|style="font-size:88%" rowspan=4|2021 US World Team Trials
|style="text-align:left;font-size:88%;" rowspan=4| Lincoln, Nebraska
|-
|Loss
|46–12
|align=left| J'den Cox
|style="font-size:88%"|0–8
|-
|Win
|46–11
|align=left| Kyven Gadson
|style="font-size:88%"|4–0
|-
|Win
|45–11
|align=left| Jack Jessen
|style="font-size:88%"|TF 10–0
|-
! style=background:white colspan=7 |
|-
|Loss
|44–11
|align=left| Nate Jackson
|style="font-size:88%"|1–2
|style="font-size:88%" rowspan=3|April 2–3, 2021
|style="font-size:88%" rowspan=3|2020 US Olympic Team Trials
|style="text-align:left;font-size:88%;" rowspan=3| Forth Worth, Texas
|-
|Win
|44–10
|align=left| Carter Starocci
|style="font-size:88%"|5–2
|-
|Loss
|43–10
|align=left| Gabe Dean
|style="font-size:88%"|1–2
|-
! style=background:white colspan=7 | 
|-
|Win
|43–9
|align=left| Clayton Pye
|style="font-size:88%"|TF 12–2
|style="font-size:88%" rowspan=4|March 7, 2021
|style="font-size:88%" rowspan=4|Matteo Pellicone Ranking Series 2021
|style="text-align:left;font-size:88%;" rowspan=4|
 Rome, Italy
|-
|Win 
|42–9
|align=left| Hunter Lee
|style="font-size:88%"|TF 10–0
|-
|Loss 
|41–9
|align=left| Mark Hall
|style="font-size:88%"|Fall
|-
|Win 
|41–8
|align=left| Ethan Ramos
|style="font-size:88%"|6–3
|-
|Win
|40–8
|align=left| Max Dean
|style="font-size:88%"|4–2
|style="font-size:88%"|January 31, 2021
|style="font-size:88%"|PRTC Summit I
|style="text-align:left;font-size:88%;" |
 Philadelphia, Pennsylvania
|-
! style=background:white colspan=7 |
|-
|Win
|39-8
|align=left| Taylor Lujan
|style="font-size:88%"|TF 10-0
|style="font-size:88%" rowspan=3|October 31, 2020
|style="font-size:88%" rowspan=3|FloWrestling 8-Man Challenge
|style="text-align:left;font-size:88%;" rowspan=3|
 United States
|-
|Win
|38-8
|align=left| Nate Jackson
|style="font-size:88%"|5-2
|-
|Win
|37-8
|align=left| Drew Foster
|style="font-size:88%"|8-0
|-
|Loss
|36-8
|align=left| David Taylor
|style="font-size:88%"|TF 0-11
|style="font-size:88%"|July 25, 2020 
|style="font-size:88%"|FloWrestling: Dake vs. Chamizo
|style="text-align:left;font-size:88%;" |
 Austin, Texas
|-
! style=background:white colspan=7 |
|-
|Win
|36-7
|align=left| Akhmed Aibuev
|style="font-size:88%"|10-6
|style="font-size:88%" rowspan=4|January 18–19, 2020
|style="font-size:88%" rowspan=4|2020 Grand Prix de France Henri Deglane
|style="text-align:left;font-size:88%;" rowspan=4|
 Nice, France
|-
|Win
|35-7
|align=left| Rasul Tsikhayeu
|style="font-size:88%"|TF 12-2
|-
|Win
|34-7
|align=left| Abdimanap Baigenzheyev
|style="font-size:88%"|6-0
|-
|Win
|33-7
|align=left| Stefan Reichmuth
|style="font-size:88%"|9-5
|-
! style=background:white colspan=7 |
|-
|Loss
|32-7
|align=left| Zahid Valencia
|style="font-size:88%"|5-7
|style="font-size:88%" rowspan=5|December 20–22, 2019
|style="font-size:88%" rowspan=5|2019 Senior Nationals - US Olympic Trials Qualifier
|style="text-align:left;font-size:88%;" rowspan=5|
 Fort Worth, Texas
|-
|Win
|32-6
|align=left| Alex Dieringer
|style="font-size:88%"|6-4
|-
|Win
|31-6
|align=left| Nick Heflin
|style="font-size:88%"|7-0
|-
|Win
|30-6
|align=left| Leonardo Tarantino
|style="font-size:88%"|TF 12-2
|-
|Win
|29-6
|align=left| Ramon Fry
|style="font-size:88%"|TF 10-0
|-
! style=background:white colspan=7 |
|-
|Loss
|28-6
|align=left| Alex Dieringer
|style="font-size:88%"|2-7
|style="font-size:88%" rowspan=5|November 15–16, 2019
|style="font-size:88%" rowspan=5|2019 Bill Farrell Memorial International Open
|style="text-align:left;font-size:88%;" rowspan=5|
 New York City, New York
|-
|Win
|28-5
|align=left| Brett Pfarr
|style="font-size:88%"|4-3
|-
|Win
|27-5
|align=left| Nate Jackson
|style="font-size:88%"|TF 10-0
|-
|Win
|26-5
|align=left| Sidus Eslami
|style="font-size:88%"|TF 10-0
|-
|Win
|25-5
|align=left| Kevin Radford
|style="font-size:88%"|4-2
|-
! style=background:white colspan=7 |
|-
|Win
|24-5
|align=left| Nate Jackson
|style="font-size:88%"|TF 10-0
|style="font-size:88%" rowspan=4|May 17–19, 2019
|style="font-size:88%" rowspan=4|2019 US World Team Trials Challenge
|style="text-align:left;font-size:88%;" rowspan=4|
 Raleigh, North Carolina
|-
|Win
|23-5
|align=left| Drew Foster
|style="font-size:88%"|TF 10-0
|-
|Loss
|22-5
|align=left| Nick Heflin
|style="font-size:88%"|1-4
|-
|Win
|22-4
|align=left| Nate Jackson
|style="font-size:88%"|5-0
|-
! style=background:white colspan=7 |
|-
|Loss
|21-4
|align=left| Pat Downey
|style="font-size:88%"|7-9
|style="font-size:88%" rowspan=5|April 24–27, 2019
|style="font-size:88%" rowspan=5|2019 US Open Championships
|style="text-align:left;font-size:88%;" rowspan=5|
 Las Vegas, Nevada
|-
|Win
|21-3
|align=left| Kevin Radford
|style="font-size:88%"|8-1
|-
|Win
|20-3
|align=left| Ruger Wyneken
|style="font-size:88%"|TF 10-0
|-
|Win
|19-3
|align=left| Colby Huynh
|style="font-size:88%"|TF 11-0
|-
|Win
|18-3
|align=left| Tanner Orndorff
|style="font-size:88%"|TF 12-2
|-
! style=background:white colspan=7 |
|-
|Loss
|17-3
|align=left| Gankhuyag Ganbaatar's
|style="font-size:88%"|1-6
|style="font-size:88%" rowspan=2|November 12–18, 2018
|style="font-size:88%" rowspan=2|2018 World U23 Wrestling Championship
|style="text-align:left;font-size:88%;" rowspan=2|
 Bucharest, Romania
|-
|Win
|17-2
|align=left| Javrail Shapiev
|style="font-size:88%"|9-6
|-
! style=background:white colspan=7 |
|-
|Win
|16-2
|align=left| Chandler Rogers
|style="font-size:88%"|Fall
|style="font-size:88%" rowspan=7|June 1–3, 2018
|style="font-size:88%" rowspan=2|2018 US U23 World Team Trials
|style="text-align:left;font-size:88%;" rowspan=7|
 Akron, Ohio
|-
|Win
|15-2
|align=left| Chandler Rogers
|style="font-size:88%"|13-9
|-
|Win
|14-2
|align=left| Maxwell Dean
|style="font-size:88%"|TF 10-0
|style="font-size:88%" rowspan=5|2018 US U23 National Championships
|-
|Win
|13-2
|align=left| Cash Wilcke
|style="font-size:88%"|TF 10-0
|-
|Win
|12-2
|align=left| Brandon Krone
|style="font-size:88%"|TF 10-0
|-
|Win
|11-2
|align=left| Tyler Rosenbaum
|style="font-size:88%"|TF 10-0
|-
|Win
|10-2
|align=left| Jackson Hemauer
|style="font-size:88%"|TF 10-0
|-
! style=background:white colspan=7 |
|-
|Loss
|9-2
|align=left| Sammy Brooks
|style="font-size:88%"|8-13
|style="font-size:88%" rowspan=5|October 7–8, 2017
|style="font-size:88%" rowspan=2|2017 US U23 World Team Trials
|style="text-align:left;font-size:88%;" rowspan=5|
 Rochester, Minnesota
|-
|Loss
|9-1
|align=left| Sammy Brooks
|style="font-size:88%"|5-9
|-
|Win
|9-0
|align=left| Jaron Smith
|style="font-size:88%"|7-4
|style="font-size:88%" rowspan=3|2017 US U23 World Team Trials Challenge
|-
|Win
|8-0
|align=left| David Willoughby
|style="font-size:88%"|TF 11-0
|-
|Win
|7-0
|align=left| Faris Karaborni
|style="font-size:88%"|TF 10-0
|-
! style=background:white colspan=7 |
|-
|Win
|6-0
|align=left| Peter Renda
|style="font-size:88%"|4-2
|style="font-size:88%" rowspan=6|June 2–4, 2017
|style="font-size:88%" rowspan=6|2017 US University National Championships
|style="text-align:left;font-size:88%;" rowspan=6|
 Akron, Ohio
|-
|Win
|5-0
|align=left| Keegan Moore
|style="font-size:88%"|TF 10-0
|-
|Win
|4-0
|align=left| Nick Gravina
|style="font-size:88%"|Injury (4-0)
|-
|Win
|3-0
|align=left| Taylor Jackson
|style="font-size:88%"|TF 10-0
|-
|Win
|2-0
|align=left| Will Schany
|style="font-size:88%"|Fall
|-
|Win
|1-0
|align=left| Maxwell Dean
|style="font-size:88%"|TF 11-0

NCAA record 

! colspan="8"| NCAA Championships Matches
|-
!  Res.
!  Record
!  Opponent
!  Score
!  Date
!  Event
|-
! style=background:white colspan=6 |2019 NCAA Championships  at 184 lbs
|-
|Win
|19-4
|align=left|Emery Parker
|style="font-size:88%"|5-3
|style="font-size:88%" rowspan=5|March 21–23, 2019
|style="font-size:88%" rowspan=5|2019 NCAA Division I Wrestling Championships
|-
|Loss
|18-4
|align=left|Maxwell Dean
|style="font-size:88%"|4-5
|-
|Win
|18-3
|align=left|Ryan Preisch
|style="font-size:88%"|MD 11-2
|-
|Win
|17-3
|align=left|Corey Hazel
|style="font-size:88%"|MD 16-5
|-
|Win
|16-3
|align=left|Bob Coleman
|style="font-size:88%"|Fall
|-
! style=background:white colspan=6 |2018 NCAA Championships  at 184 lbs
|-
|Loss
|15-3
|align=left|Bo Nickal
|style="font-size:88%"|Fall
|style="font-size:88%" rowspan=5|March 15–17, 2018
|style="font-size:88%" rowspan=5|2018 NCAA Division I Wrestling Championships
|-
|Win
|15-2
|align=left|Zachary Zavatsky 
|style="font-size:88%"|8-4
|-
|Win
|14-2
|align=left|Chip Ness
|style="font-size:88%"|10-6
|-
|Win
|13-2
|align=left|Mitchell Bowman
|style="font-size:88%"|MD 17-5
|-
|Win
|12-2
|align=left|Bryce Gorman
|style="font-size:88%"|TF 24-9
|-
! style=background:white colspan=6 |2017 NCAA Championships 5th at 184 lbs
|-
|Win
|11-2
|align=left|Nolan Boyd
|style="font-size:88%"|10-6
|style="font-size:88%" rowspan=8|March 16–18, 2017
|style="font-size:88%" rowspan=8|2017 NCAA Division I Wrestling Championships
|-
|Loss
|10-2
|align=left|Sammy Brooks
|style="font-size:88%"|2-6
|-
|Win
|10-1
|align=left|Drew Foster
|style="font-size:88%"|8-6
|-
|Win
|9-1
|align=left|Jack Dechow
|style="font-size:88%"|TB-1 3-2
|-
|Win
|8-1
|align=left|Dakota Geer
|style="font-size:88%"|MD 12-3
|-
|Win
|7-1
|align=left|Joe Heyob
|style="font-size:88%"|TF 18-3
|-
|Loss
|6-1
|align=left|Emery Parker
|style="font-size:88%"|9-14
|-
|Win
|6–0
|align=left|Garrett Hoffman
|style="font-size:88%"|MD 23-10
|-
! style=background:white colspan=6 |2016 NCAA Championships  at 174 lbs
|-
|Win
|5–0
|align=left|Bo Nickal
|style="font-size:88%"|11-9
|style="font-size:88%" rowspan=5|March 17–19, 2016
|style="font-size:88%" rowspan=5|2016 NCAA Division I Wrestling Championships
|-
|Win
|4–0
|align=left|Lelund Weatherspoon
|style="font-size:88%"|8-2
|-
|Win
|3–0
|align=left|Matt Reed
|style="font-size:88%"|2-0
|-
|Win
|2–0
|align=left|Bryce Hammond
|style="font-size:88%"|5-3
|-
|Win
|1–0
|align=left|Nick Wanzek
|style="font-size:88%"|MD 12-4
|-

Stats 

!  Season
!  Year
!  School
!  Rank
!  Weigh Class
!  Record
!  Win
!  Bonus
|-
|2019
|Senior
|rowspan=4|Ohio State University
|#1 (3rd)
|rowspan=3|184
|25-1
|96.15%
|61.54%
|-
|2018
|Junior
|#2 (2nd)
|31-3
|91.18%
|70.59%
|-
|2017
|Sophomore
|#6 (5th)
|32-9
|78.05%
|53.66%
|-
|2016
|Freshman
|#11 (1st)
|174
|33-6
|84.62%
|51.28%
|-
|colspan=5 bgcolor="LIGHTGREY"|Career
|bgcolor="LIGHTGREY"|121-19
|bgcolor="LIGHTGREY"|86.43%
|bgcolor="LIGHTGREY"|58.57%

References

External links 
 

1996 births
Living people
American male sport wrestlers
Ohio State Buckeyes wrestlers
Ohio State University alumni
People from Penns Grove, New Jersey
Sportspeople from Salem County, New Jersey
Amateur wrestlers